The Women's 5K race at the 2010 FINA World Open Water Swimming Championships was swum on Tuesday, July 20, 2010, in Roberval, Quebec, Canada.

The race began at 10:30 a.m., and was swum in the Lac Saint-Jean in the city centre. 35 women swam the event.

The 5 kilometre distance of the race was reached by completed 2 laps of the 2.5-kilometre course set up for the championships.

Results
All times in hours:minutes:seconds

References

Fina World Open Water Swimming Championships - Women's 5k, 2010
World Open Water Swimming Championships